Anders Hedberg (born 25 February 1951) is a Swedish former professional ice hockey player who was one of the first European-born players to make an impact in North America. Along with countryman Ulf Nilsson, Hedberg signed a contract to play for the Winnipeg Jets in the World Hockey Association (WHA) in 1974, after having represented both Modo Hockey and Djurgårdens IF in his native Sweden. Hedberg subsequently played during seven seasons in the National Hockey League (NHL) for the New York Rangers. He was twice voted best junior in Sweden and as such the only one (1969 and 1970) and is a graduate from the Stockholm School of Physical Education (GIH).

Playing career
Hedberg was an instant sensation in the WHA, recording 100 points in 65 games in his first season, and playing alongside established superstar Bobby Hull. He scored at least 50 goals and 100 points in his other three WHA seasons, peaking with 70 goals and 61 assists in 1976-77 despite only playing 68 games that year.

Hedberg played a starring role when the Jets won the Avco World Trophy WHA championship in 1976 and 1978. In the summer of 1978, Nilsson and Hedberg signed with the NHL's New York Rangers for $2.4 million, one of the first open acknowledgements that the quality of the WHA was on par with the NHL, making a merger with the WHA possible the following summer.

In his first NHL season, Hedberg was a member of the member of the NHL All-Stars that faced the USSR National Team in the 1979 Challenge Cup.

Hedberg recorded 856 professional points in North American hockey over 751 games, and retired from the Rangers in 1985.

Post-playing career
After his active career, Hedberg became an assistant to general manager Craig Patrick of the New York Rangers, the first European to have a front office job in the NHL. Between 1991 and 1997 he worked as a scout for the Toronto Maple Leafs before moving up to the position as assistant general manager from 1997 to 1999.

In 2000, he was appointed general manager of the Swedish national ice hockey team, later serving with the Ottawa Senators as Director of Player Personnel from 2002 to 2007. In August 2007, he returned to the New York Rangers as the Head Professional European Scout. He was elected to the Swedish Hockey Hall of Fame on 11 February 2012.

Awards and achievements
Swedish Junior Player of the Year (1969 and 1970)
Named Best Forward at EJC-A (1970)
Lou Kaplan Trophy winner (1975)
WHA Second All-Star Team (1975 and 1978)
WHA First All-Star Team (1976 and 1977)
Avco Cup championships (1976 and 1978)
Played in the 1976 Canada Cup and 1981 Canada Cup tournament
Bill Masterton Trophy winner (1985)
Played in NHL All-Star Game (1985)
Inducted into the IIHF Hall of Fame in 1997
Honoured Member of the Manitoba Hockey Hall of Fame
 In the 2009 book 100 Ranger Greats, was ranked No. 36 all-time of the 901 New York Rangers who had played during the team's first 82 seasons
Inaugural member of the World Hockey Association Hall of Fame.
Scored 50 goals in 50 games in 1977

Career statistics

Regular season and playoffs

International

References

External links
 

1951 births
Bill Masterton Memorial Trophy winners
IIHF Hall of Fame inductees
Living people
Modo Hockey players
National Hockey League All-Stars
New York Rangers executives
New York Rangers players
New York Rangers scouts
Ottawa Senators executives
People from Örnsköldsvik Municipality
Swedish expatriate ice hockey players in Canada
Swedish expatriate ice hockey players in the United States
Swedish ice hockey right wingers
Toronto Maple Leafs executives
Toronto Maple Leafs scouts
Undrafted National Hockey League players
Winnipeg Jets (WHA) players
Sportspeople from Västernorrland County